The genus Mesosmittia is cosmopolitan, thus occurring in all biogeographical regions except for Antarctica. Almost nothing or very little is known about its ecology, the larva of one species was described by Strenze (1950) as terrestrial, but adults can be collected using emergence traps set over rivulets.

The genus was recently revised for the Neotropics with descriptions of new species.

The genus comprises:

M. acutistylus Sæther, recorded from United States and Mexico.
M. annae Andersen & Mendes, recorded from Guatemala and Mexico.
M. flexuella (Edwards), recorded from all over Europe.
M. glabra Andersen & Mendes, recorded from Ecuador.
M. guanajensis Andersen & Mendes, recorded from Mexico.
M. hirta Andersen & Mendes, recorded from Ecuador, only the holotype is known.
M. lobiga Sæther, recorded from United States and Mexico.
M. museophila Donato, recorded from South America.
M. patrihortae Sæther, recorded from various locations in the Neotropics, United States, China, and South Africa.
M. prolixa Sæther, recorded from United States and Mexico.
M. tora Sæther, recorded from United States and Mexico.
M. truncata Sæther, recorded from Panama, only the holotype is known.

References
Andersen, T.A. & Mendes, H.F. 2002. Neotropical and Mexican Mesosmittia Brundin, with description of four new species (Insecta, Diptera, Chironomidae). Spixiana 25: 141-155.
Brundin, L. 1956. Zur Systematik der Orthocladiinae (Dipt., Chironomidae). Rep. Inst. Freshwat. Res. Drottningholm 37: 5-185.
Donato, M. 2011. A new species of the genus Mesismittia Brundin, 1956 (Diptera: Chironomidae) from the Neotropics with a cladistic analysis of the genus using quantitative characters. Zootaxa 2836: 51-61.

Chironomidae